Tinne is a Dutch surname. Notable people with this surname include:

 Alexine Tinne (1835–1869), Dutch explorer and photographer
 Emily Tinne (1886–1966), British collector of clothes
 John Tinne (1877–1933), British politician
 Philippe Frédéric Tinne or Philip Frederick Tinne (18 November 1772-27 July 1844), Dutch businessman and slave-owner in Demerara; partner in Sandbach, Tinne & Company

See also
 Tinne (disambiguation)